Herochroma holelaica is a moth of the family Geometridae first described by Louis Beethoven Prout in 1935. It lives on Java.

References

Moths described in 1935
Pseudoterpnini
Moths of Indonesia